Emily Hangstefer (born 26 October 1989) is an American deaf tennis player. She has competed at the 2013 Summer Deaflympics which was held in Sofia, Bulgaria.

Biography 
Hangstefer is the youngest of six children who grew up among a tennis playing family in Signal Mountain, Tennessee. She and her two elder brothers, Jim and Daniel, were born deaf. Emily has had 58-decibel hearing loss in both ears since childhood. She graduated from the University of Tennessee in Chattanooga. During her youth she used to play tennis with her elder brother, Daniel.

In 2014, Hangstefer became the first tennis player to win the USA Deaf Sports Federation's Sportswoman of the Year award.

2013 Summer Deaflympics 
At the 2013 Summer Deaflympics, she won the women's doubles title along with fellow emerging American deaf tennis player, Laura Chapman. They defeated the second seeded Chinese deaf tennis players, Ho Chiu-mei and Hsiu-Hsiang Ho in straight sets (6–4, 6–1).

Hangstefer partnered with her elder brother, Daniel, who is also a tennis coach in mixed doubles, and secured the silver medal in the event.

See also 
 United States at the Deaflympics

References 

1989 births
Living people
American female tennis players
Deaf tennis players
Tennis people from Tennessee
People from Signal Mountain, Tennessee
University of Tennessee at Chattanooga alumni
American deaf people
21st-century American women